Lee Jae-yoon (born December 15, 1984) is a South Korean-Canadian actor and model. He is best known for his roles in the television dramas My Love By My Side (2011), Heartless City (2013), and Weightlifting Fairy Kim Bok-joo (2015–2016).

Lee is a purple belt in Brazilian jiu-jitsu and a committed fitness enthusiast.

Early life and education
Lee was born to Lee Hwan-mook and Oh Young-hee in Seoul, South Korea on December 15, 1984, and raised in Toronto, Ontario, Canada. He attended the St. Elizabeth Catholic High School in Thornhill, Ontario for his secondary education. Lee was completing a degree in sports at the University of Toronto when he was scouted by a South Korean talent agency in an audition, and thus introduced into Korean show business.

Moving back to South Korea and starting his career as an actor, Lee enrolled in and would eventually complete a theater studies degree from Dongguk University, where he would later on be appointed as university ambassador.

Career Beginnings 
In an interview, Lee disclosed that his beginnings as an actor in South Korea came with some challenges and difficulties. Besides the very competitive auditions for roles, there were also the suggestions and offers for him to do cosmetic surgery; to trim his nose, soften his jawline, and even straighten his teeth. But Lee said he decided not to do any of the procedures because he felt he was doing away with what his parents have naturally given him in terms of appearance, and that he hated the thought of getting any aesthetic enhancements.

He also tried losing weight as a new actor, because it was required for him to do so. There was one project where he had to lose 10 kilograms, and he did. But Lee said it did not really open new doors for him. So, upon getting more acting experience, he decided to keep his weight and strengthen his physique instead. Now, projects and producers look for him, "because there aren't many like me. They want that masculine look, the jawline and everything. They are finally looking for that now."

Personal life

Lee is a brown belt in Brazilian jiu-jitsu and had competed in tournaments, before his foray into acting and modeling. He still goes to the gym, swims, and does jiu-jitsu three or four times a week to keep his physique.

Lee has revealed his father has played a major influence on his healthy and athletic lifestyle. He says he has always been the athletic type, joining marathons in school, because his father encouraged him so. In high school, he was the fastest track and field athlete, that even his peers expected him to eventually make it to the Olympics. Lee further disclosed that aside from this parents, Bruce Lee was always an inspiration for him growing up.

As an adult, Lee maintains he is a committed fitness enthusiast; besides doing the usual rounds at the gym and jiu-jitsu, Lee is also into judo, muay thai, and deep-water diving. This healthy and athletic lifestyle even influences his choice of an ideal partner. Lee has revealed in an interview that he would be pleased to find a romantic partner in the future who is also into sports and the active lifestyle, one with whom he can swim, run, or dive.

As an athlete, Lee has been working closely with the sportswear and sports gear brand Puma, both as an endorser and ambassador. He regularly joins the Puma Run events in Singapore and Malaysia.

Relationship 
In October 5, 2022, it was confirmed that Lee will hold a wedding ceremony with his non-celebrity girlfriend in November 2022.

Filmography

Television series

Film

Web series

Variety show

Music video

Awards and nominations

References

External links
 
 
 
 

1984 births
Living people
21st-century Canadian male actors
21st-century South Korean male actors
Canadian male film actors
Canadian male television actors
Canadian male actors of Korean descent
Dongguk University alumni
Male actors from Seoul
Male actors from Toronto
South Korean emigrants to Canada
South Korean male film actors
South Korean male television actors
Theatre studies
University of Toronto alumni